A2M may refer to:

 The a2 Milk Company, an ASX listed company which sells dairy products, including baby formula 
 α2-Macroglobulin, a gene with the ability to inhibit all four classes of proteinases by a unique "trapping" mechanism
 Artificial Mind and Movement, a Canadian games development company
 Ass to mouth, a sexual act